Jonathan Ávila Martínez (born 1 November 1991) is a Colombian footballer who plays as a centre-back for Atlético Grau in the Peruvian Primera División.

Honours

Club
Junior
Copa Colombia (1): 2017

External links
 

Living people
1991 births
People from Bucaramanga
Colombian footballers
Colombian expatriate footballers
Categoría Primera A players
Categoría Primera B players
Peruvian Primera División players
La Equidad footballers
Atlético Bucaramanga footballers
Alianza Petrolera players
Atlético Junior footballers
Atlético Grau footballers
Association football central defenders
Colombian expatriate sportspeople in Peru
Expatriate footballers in Peru
Sportspeople from Santander Department
21st-century Colombian people